Aerial Assault may refer to:

 Air assault, a type of military operation
 Aerial Assault, a console video game
 Aerial Assault, an episode of The Transformers television series
 Tribes: Aerial Assault, an online first-person shooter video game